The following lists events that happened during 1999 in the Grand Duchy of Luxembourg.

Incumbents

Events

January – March
 1 January – The Euro is launched, replacing the Luxembourgian franc.  Franc currency is still used in circulation, but at a fixed exchange rate of 40.3399 to 1 Euro.
 15 March – The Santer Commission, under the leadership of Luxembourger Jacques Santer, resigns in the face of corruption allegations.

April – June
 29 April – Jean-Claude Juncker delivers his fifth State of the Nation address.
 13 May – Jeunesse Esch win the Luxembourg Cup, beating FC Mondercange 3–0 in the final.
 13 June – Legislative and European elections are held.  The LSAP lose four seats in the Chamber of Deputies, with the DP and ADR picking up five between them.
 13 June – Belgium's Marc Wauters wins the 1999 Tour de Luxembourg.
 16 June – SES launches its ninth satellite, Astra 1H.

July – September
 7 August – Jean-Claude Juncker forms a new government, with Lydie Polfer as his deputy.
 11 August – A total solar eclipse is visible in Luxembourg.
 10 October – Communal elections are held.

October – December
 24 December – Grand Duke Jean announces that he is to abdicate in favour of his eldest son, Hereditary Grand Duke Henri.  No date is yet given.

Deaths
 11 February – Maggy Stein, sculptor
 22 October - Laure Koster, musician and Olympian

References

 
Years of the 20th century in Luxembourg
Luxembourg